Allerton Junction is an at grade junction signal box just east of Liverpool South Parkway, Allerton, Merseyside. It takes its name from the former Allerton station that South Parkway replaced.

The junction is where the Liverpool to Manchester line branches off the Liverpool branch of the West Coast Main Line. Services operating over the junction are East Midlands Railway (to Nottingham & Norwich), TransPennine Express (Leeds & Scarborough), West Midlands Trains (Birmingham New Street), Northern (stopping services to Manchester Victoria) and Avanti West Coast (London Euston).

History
It has only existed in current form since 1966, as prior to this the former Cheshire Lines Committee (CLC) main line from Manchester Central passed beneath the London & North Western Railway (LNWR) main line and continued on to Liverpool Central High Level. However the 1963 Beeching Report recommended that all mainline rail services into Liverpool be concentrated at the ex-LNWR Liverpool Lime Street station and that the CLC Central High Level station be closed. Accordingly, a new connection to Hunts Cross West Junction (known as the Hunts Cross chord) was built by British Rail in 1965/66 to link the two routes and allow services from the Warrington and Manchester direction to join the LNWR line from Crewe and so reach Liverpool Lime Street.

Operation
Though there are two pairs of lines through South Parkway station on the main line, only the fast (eastern) ones are linked to the Hunts Cross route - any on the western (slow) pair must be crossed over to the fast lines north of the station if heading towards Manchester.  Allerton Junction signal box (a flat roofed BR standard structure built at the same time as the chord) is located immediately beyond the junction, operating it and the connections into the nearby Allerton TMD.

See also
Allerton TMD depot

References

Rail transport in Merseyside
Rail junctions in England
1966 establishments in England